José María Cornelio Figueroa Alcorta (November 20, 1860 – December 27, 1931) was an Argentine lawyer and politician, who managed to be the only person to head the three powers of the State: Vice President of the Nation (President of the Senate), from October 12, 1904 to March 12, 1906, President of the Nation from that date and until October 12, 1910; and President of the Supreme Court of Justice of the Argentine Nation, from 1929 until his death in 1931.

Biography 
Figueroa Alcorta was born in Córdoba as the son of José Figueroa and Teodosia Alcorta. He was elected a National Deputy for Córdoba before becoming Provincial Governor in 1895. In 1898 he returned to the Argentine Congress as a Senator. In 1904 he became Vice-President of Argentina and in 1906 succeeded Manuel Quintana as President. He was an active Freemason.

References

External links
 

Presidents of Argentina
Vice presidents of Argentina
1860 births
1931 deaths
Politicians from Córdoba, Argentina
Argentine people of Galician descent
National Autonomist Party politicians
Members of the Argentine Chamber of Deputies elected in Córdoba
Members of the Argentine Senate for Córdoba
Governors of Córdoba Province, Argentina
Argentine Freemasons
National University of Córdoba alumni
20th-century Argentine judges
Supreme Court of Argentina justices
Burials at La Recoleta Cemetery
20th-century Argentine politicians
Patrician families of Buenos Aires
19th-century Argentine lawyers